The Penn Line is a MARC commuter rail service running from Union Station in Washington, D.C., to Perryville, Maryland, along the far southern leg of the Northeast Corridor. However, the great majority of trains terminate at Baltimore's Penn Station. It is MARC's busiest and only electric line. The service is operated by Amtrak under contract to the Maryland Transit Administration. MARC sets the schedules, owns most of the stations, and controls fares, while Amtrak owns and maintains the right-of-way, supplies employees to operate trains, and maintains the rolling stock. It is by far the busiest of MARC's three lines, with twice as many trains and twice as many passengers as the Brunswick and Camden lines combined.

The Penn Line is the successor to commuter services between Washington and Baltimore provided by the Pennsylvania Railroad (PRR), Penn Central, and Conrail dating back as early as 1881. Additionally, Amtrak operated a commuter service named the Chesapeake between 1978–1983.

In 1983, Maryland, along with a number of other Northeastern states, took control of its commuter railroads. Amtrak, which had acquired the right-of-way from Penn Central, took over operation of the former PRR commuter line, which was rebranded as AMDOT (Amtrak/Maryland Department of Transportation). The Chesapeake was discontinued later in 1983 due to low ridership and massive duplication with AMDOT. A year later, all commuter service in Maryland was merged under the MARC brand.

With fast and frequent MARC and Amtrak service, the Washington-Baltimore section of the Northeast Corridor is one of the busiest rail lines in the United States.

Rolling stock

The Penn Line uses diesel as well as electric locomotives for powering trains. Most electric and rush hour diesel trains are 6-8 cars long, and are primarily made up of Kawasaki bi-levels. During the day, shorter 4-6 car MultiLevels or single level diesel trains from the Brunswick and Camden lines are used on the Penn Line. For the spring and summer months, weekend Penn Line trains also include a single-level Bike Car that is specially equipped to accommodate bicyclists.

All trains are operated in push-pull configuration with the cab-car end towards Washington.

Service
MARC runs 58 Penn Line trains during a normal weekday. A single morning train and a single evening train run between Perryville and Penn Station, and a single early morning train runs from Martin State Airport to Penn Station. Unlike MARC's other two lines, the Penn Line operates all throughout the day and well into the night.

On December 7, 2013, the Penn Line also began offering limited weekend service. Penn Line weekend service consists of 9 round trips on Saturday and 6 round trips on Sunday—primarily between Penn Station and Union Station.  Several trains extend service to Martin State Airport, and all trains skip .

Beginning on December 13, 2014, a separate Bike Car was added to some weekend Penn Line trains. Bike Cars are reconditioned Sumitomo/Nippon Sharyo MARC IIA single-level commuter railcars. One side of each car's interior is lined with bicycle racks which are arranged to secure 23 full-sized, non-collapsible bicycles, and the other side provides seating for 40 passengers. The Bike Car program was expanded during 2015 to include all weekend trains. There is no extra charge for using the Bike Car, which is available on a first-come, first-served basis.  Beginning in 2016, MARC began installing bike racks on its bi-level train cars and some of its single-level cars.  Weekday service was intended to begin in summer 2018, however, this was delayed several times.  Eventually, 35 Penn Line railcars had full-sized bicycle racks installed, and weekday use of the bike racks on the MARC Penn line officially began on January 21, 2019. These railcars are available on most weekday rush-hour Penn Line trains and on all weekend trains.  As with the former Bike Cars, these services are first-come, first served with no additional charge, and the bicyclist must make sure to be able to access the platform of the station they desire.

Amtrak's Acela Express, Northeast Regional, and other long distance trains share tracks along the whole of the Penn Line. Washington Union and Baltimore Penn are the second and eighth busiest Amtrak stations in the country, respectively. MARC passengers with monthly and weekly tickets can ride select Amtrak Northeast Regional trains during the week only, as part of their cross-honoring agreement. Connections are also available to the Washington Metro's Orange Line at New Carrollton, Red Line at Washington Union Station, and to the MTA Light Rail at Baltimore Penn Station.

The MTA has plans to extend the Penn Line to Newark station in Delaware to connect with the Wilmington/Newark Line of SEPTA or even further north to 30th Street Station in Philadelphia. The PRR's commuter route had run as far north as Philadelphia until the early 1960s. 

The MTA funds a local bus connection between Newark and Baltimore with a transfer at Elkton station. A bill in Maryland awaiting the signature of Governor Larry Hogan would extend MARC service from Perryville to Newark. In 2020, Representative Edward Osienski and Senator Stephanie Hansen cosponsored a resolution to the Delaware General Assembly that will add commuter rail service between Newark and Perryville, involving an extension of MARC service to connect with SEPTA at Newark and provide an alternate to Amtrak for Delaware residents wanting to travel to Baltimore and Washington, D.C. This resolution will be introduced into the Delaware General Assembly in 2021.

Longer-term plans include construction of new track and extending the line past Washington Union Station to L'Enfant Plaza station and into northern Virginia. The Purple Line light rail system, under construction as of 2022, will connect to all three MARC lines; the transfer to the Penn Line will be at New Carrollton.

Stations

The following stations are served by Penn Line trains; not all trains stop at all stations.

References

External links

MTA MARC Train

MARC Train
 
Maryland railroads
Washington, D.C., railroads
Passenger rail transportation in Maryland
Passenger rail transportation in Washington, D.C.
Electric railways in Maryland
Electric railways in Washington, D.C.
Transportation in Baltimore
Philadelphia, Baltimore and Washington Railroad lines
1834 establishments in Maryland
1834 establishments in Washington, D.C.